
The Avia BH-25 was a biplane airliner built in Czechoslovakia in 1926.

Typical of airliners of its time, it seated five passengers within its fuselage, whilst the pilots sat in an open cockpit above. Of conventional configuration, it was a single-bay bi-plane of equal span and unstaggered wings, with fixed tailskid landing gear. Originally designed for a Lorraine-Dietrich engine, this was changed to a Bristol Jupiter in service. After their withdrawal from airline use in 1936, some were used by the military for a while before finally becoming training targets.

Variants
 BH-25L – with Lorraine Dietrich engine
 BH-25J – with Bristol Jupiter engine

Operators

 Czechoslovakian Airlines – eight aircraft

 Royal Romanian Air Force
 SNNA – four aircraft

Specifications (BH-25J)

References

Further reading

External links

 airwar.ru

1920s Czechoslovakian airliners
BH-25